Miss Teen USA 2011 was the 29th Miss Teen USA pageant. It was held at the Grand Ballroom, Atlantis Paradise Island, Nassau, The Bahamas on July 16, 2011. Miss Teen USA 2010, Kamie Crawford, crowned her successor, Danielle Doty of Texas, as Miss Teen USA 2011 at the end of this event. The 50 states and the District of Columbia competed for the prestigious title. For the first time, viewers were allowed to vote for their favorite opening dress and swimsuit designed by the official sponsors, Sherri Hill and Kooey Australia. People's Choice along with Miss Universe Organization created an online poll for selecting Miss Teen USA Photogenic, won by Courtney Coleman of Hawaii. Savannah Schechter of New Jersey, won the Miss Congeniality award at the pageant.

For the first time ever, both the preliminary competition and the final show were webcast live via UStream and NewTek on www.missteenusa.com and seventeen.com. The preliminary competition took place of July 15th and was hosted by Chet Buchanan and Kamie Crawford. The final show was hosted by Chet Buchanan and Allie LaForce, Miss Teen USA 2005. Kia Hampton, Miss Kentucky USA 2011, provided entertainment by singing at the show.

Results

Placements

Special Awards
Miss Congeniality:  New Jersey - Savannah Schechter
Miss Photogenic:  Hawaii - Courtney Coleman

Delegates

Replacements
Pennsylvania - Deana Chuzhinina was originally Miss Pennsylvania Teen USA 2011 but resigned due to unknown reasons. Madison Longstreth, the 1st runner up, replaced her.

Judges
Dr. Cheryl Karcher
BJ Coleman
Lora Flaugh
Fred Nelson
Vinnie Potestivo
Katherine Schwarzenegger
Michelle Wiltshire

Entertainment
 Kia Hampton, Miss Kentucky USA 2011

References

External links
 Miss Teen USA official website

2011
2011 in the Bahamas
2011 in the United States
2011 beauty pageants